Ringtail, ring tail, or ring-tail may refer to:

Animals

Mammals
 Ring-tailed cat, Bassariscus astutus, a mammal of the raccoon family, in North America
 South American coati, Nasua nasua, also called the ring-tailed coati
 Ring-tailed ground squirrel, Spermophilus annulatus, of North America
 Ring-tailed lemur, Lemur catta, of  Madagascar
 Ring-tailed mongoose, Galidia elegans, of Madagascar
 Ringtail possums, the family Pseudocheiridae, of Australia and New Guinea:
 Cinereus ringtail possum, Pseudochirulus cinereus
 Common ringtail possum, Pseudocheirus peregrinus
 Western ringtail possum, Pseudocheirus peregrinus occidentalis
 Coppery ringtail possum Pseudochirops cupreus
 D'Albertis' ringtail possum, Pseudochirops albertisii
 Green ringtail possum, Pseudochirops archeri
 Herbert River ringtail possum, Pseudochirulus herbertensis
 Lemur-like ringtail possum, Hemibelideus lemuroides
 Lowland ringtail possum, Pseudochirulus canescens
 Painted ringtail possum, Pseudochirulus forbesi
 Plush-coated ringtail possum, Pseudochirops corinnae
 Pygmy ringtail possum, Pseudochirulus mayeri
 Reclusive ringtail possum, Pseudochirops coronatus
 Rock-haunting ringtail possum, Petropseudes dahli
 Vogelkop ringtail possum, Pseudochirulus schlegeli
 Weyland ringtail possum, Pseudochirulus caroli

Other
 Ring-tailed pigeon Patagioenas caribaea, a bird
 Ring-tails (harrier), an informal term for the juveniles and females of several species of harrier
 Erpetogomphus, a genus of dragonflies known as "ringtails"

Other uses
 Ringtail (disease), a rodent disease

See also
 Ringtail (sail), an extra sail, usually set in light winds, extending abaft the leech of a fore and aft sail
 HMS Ringtail or RNAS Burscough, a former navy airfield in Lancashire, England
 Ubuntu 13.04 Raring Ringtail, a version of Ubuntu named after the ringtail raccoon
 Ring-tailed cardinalfish, Apogon aureus, a fish
 Blue ringtail, Austrolestes annulosus, Australian damselfly
 Metallic ringtail, Austrolestes cingulatus, Australian damselfly
 Capuchin monkey, New World monkeys of the subfamily Cebinae
 Cacomistle, Bassariscus sumichrasti, a member of the carnivoran family Procyonidae
 
 

Animal common name disambiguation pages
Former disambiguation pages converted to set index articles